Overproof is the first full-length album by the American hip hop duo Substance Abuse. The Los Angeles-based group have garnered much acclaim following the release of the album, particularly for its incorporation of legendary MC Kool Keith and the ever-present MF Doom on the songs 'Night On The Town' and 'Profitless Thoughts' respectively.  The album received four stars in URB and Scratch Magazine.

Track listing 
 "Fake Contacts" – 2:52
 "Night on the Town" (feat. Kool Keith) – 4:31
 "Profitless Thoughts" (feat. MF DOOM) – 3:29
 "Mercy Killings" (feat. Deranged, Mawnstr & Nebz) – 4:44
 "No Guarantees" – 5:42
 "Myka Nyne (Interlude)" – 0:29
 "Everyone's a Critic" (feat. Rasco) – 4:24
 "The Graduate" – 4:32
 "Sickness" – 3:54
 "Check" (feat. Motion Man) – 5:28
 "Withdrawals, Pt. 2" – 3:23
 "Can't Call It" (feat. P.E.A.C.E., Deranged & Mawnstr) – 5:30
 "I Don't Mean to Talk Shit (Ill Spoken Skit)" – 2:03
 "Collateral Damage" (feat. Prego W/ Zest) – 3:21
 "Fractured Form" (feat. Erik Solo)" – 4:30
 "Sickness (Remix)" (feat. Saafir) – 3:09

2006 albums